William Beauclerk may refer to:

 Lord William Beauclerk (1698–1733), MP for Chichester
 William Beauclerk, 8th Duke of St Albans (1766–1825),  British peer 
 William Beauclerk, 9th Duke of St Albans (1801–1849), British peer 
 William Beauclerk, 10th Duke of St Albans (1840–1898), British peer